The Gay & Lesbian Review Worldwide (formerly The Harvard Gay & Lesbian Review) is a bimonthly, nationally distributed magazine of history, culture, and politics for LGBT people and their allies who are interested in the gamut of social, scientific, and cultural issues raised by same-sex sexuality. Library Journal (in its July 1995 issue) described it as “the journal of record for LGBT issues.”

History 
Initially The Harvard Gay & Lesbian Review was published by the Harvard Gay & Lesbian Caucus. In 1996 the magazine was organized as a 501(c)(3) educational corporation. In 2000, the magazine’s name was changed to The Gay & Lesbian Review Worldwide to reflect its independent status, and in 2001 the Review started to publish on a bimonthly basis. Since around 2017 December, the Review says it has a circulation of about 9,000 regular subscribers.

Current status 

Dr. Richard Schneider is editor-in-chief. Martha E. Stone is the literary editor.

From the magazine’s inception, each issue has been organized around a conceptual theme with essays from leading scholars and writers in the given field. Recent themes have included, for example, “The science of homosexuality”, “Eros and God”, and “Weird Psychology”. In addition to these essays, which account for about 60% of the magazine’s content, each issue offers book reviews, several poems, and special columns such as “International Spectrum” and “Artist’s Profile”. In February 2016, the Review launched a redesigned website, which offers a sampling of articles from the current and past issues, writers’ guidelines, subscription information, and so on.

The mission of The Gay & Lesbian Review Worldwide is to provide a forum for enlightened discussion of issues and ideas of importance to lesbians and gay men; to advance gay and lesbian culture by providing a quality vehicle for its best writers and thinkers; and to educate a broader public on gay and lesbian topics.

Barney Frank has referred to The Review as the only place where he can write an article confident that the readership is both gay and intelligent. In a 1998 New York Times interview, Larry Kramer described The Gay & Lesbian Review as "our intellectual journal, for better or for worse. If you want to deal with scholarly intelligent arguments, there's really no place else we can publish."

In 2022, The Review expanded to podcasting with the launch of their first podcast, popular, on Spotify and Apple Podcasts, hosted by William Keiser. The podcast gained media attention for its dissection of the "dark underbelly of the District’s queer community, with a specific focus on the cliques and clichés gay men face."

Some notable contributors 

Edward Albee
David Bergman
Michael Bronski
Alfred Corn
Samuel R. Delany
John D'Emilio
Emma Donoghue
Martin Duberman
Lillian Faderman
Edward Field
Barney Frank

Jewelle Gomez
Marilyn Hacker
Andrew Holleran
Jill Johnston
Matthew Kennedy
Larry Kramer
John Lauritsen
Terrence McNally
Eileen Myles
Thom Nickels
William Percy

Felice Picano
John Rechy
Ned Rorem
Douglas Sadownick
Sarah Schulman
Gore Vidal
Patricia Nell Warren
Edmund White
Evan Wolfson

References

External links

LGBT-related mass media in the United States
Sexology journals
Publications established in 1993
LGBT-related journals